Tapkhar (Tobkhor) is a rural locality (a settlement) in Ivolginsky District, Republic of Buryatia, Russia. The population was 566 as of 2010. There is 1 street.

Geography 
Tapkhar is located 10 km southeast of Ivolginsk (the district's administrative centre) by road. Ulan-Ivolginsky is the nearest rural locality.

References 

Rural localities in Ivolginsky District